Nobuko JoAnne Miyamoto (born November 14, 1939) is a Japanese American folk singer, songwriter, author, and activist in the Asian American Movement. She was a member of the band Yellow Pearl along with Chris Kando Iijima and Charlie Chin. They are known for co-creating the 1973 folk album A Grain of Sand: Music for the Struggle by Asians in America. This album is considered the first Asian-American album in history. She was a member of the band Warriors of the Rainbow during the late 1970s.

In 2021, Miyamoto released an album titled 120,000 Stories, named after the approximate number of Japanese Americans, Miyamoto included, who were incarcerated by the U.S. government during World War II. She uses her music as a platform for her activism concerning issues such as the Asian American Movement, the Black Lives Matter Movement, and climate change.

Early life 
Miyamoto was born in Los Angeles, California, on November 14,1939. According to Miyamoto, her earliest memory is of Santa Anita Park racetrack, where she and her family were being temporarily held before being sent to the incarceration camps for Japanese Americans following President Franklin D. Roosevelt's signing of Executive Order 9066, which authorized this mass imprisonment. Miyamoto and her family were sent to Glasgow, Montana, after her father volunteered to work harvesting beets on a farm. They were eventually released to live with Miyamoto's grandfather in Parker, Idaho, and later Ogden, Utah, until the end of World War II.

Dancing career 
Miyamoto started dancing in the years following the war. She began appearing in films and productions, where she was known and credited as Joanne Miya. When she was 15, she appeared in the film version of The King and I (1956).

She played Francisca, the girlfriend of one of the Sharks, in the 1961 film version of West Side Story, appearing in all of the Sharks' musical numbers.

Singing and activism 
In 1978, Miyamoto founded the multicultural arts organization Great Leap. Great Leap hosts FandangObon, a festival that brings together Japanese, Mexican, and African American music and dance traditions. The festival was founded by Miyamoto in collaboration with Chicano musician Quetzal Flores.

References 

1939 births
Living people
Asian-American movement activists
Japanese-American civil rights activists
American folk musicians
Japanese-American internees
Asian American music
American women singer-songwriters
American women writers
American women writers of Asian descent
American dancers of Asian descent
People from Los Angeles